The 2012–13 season is the 10th in the history of the Scarlets Welsh regional rugby union side. In this season, they competed in the Pro12, the Heineken Cup and the LV Cup.

At the end of the season, Jonathan Davies and George North were called up to the British & Irish Lions squad for the 2013 tour to Australia.

Pre-season and friendlies

Rabo Direct PRO12

Fixtures

Play-off

Table

Anglo-Welsh Cup

Fixtures

Table
Pool 3

Heineken Cup

Fixtures

Table
Pool 5

Transfers

In

Out

Statistics

Stats accurate as of match played 20 April 2013

References

2012-13
2012–13 Pro12 by team
2012–13 in Welsh rugby union
2012–13 Heineken Cup by team